The Constitution of the Principality of Liechtenstein was promulgated on 5 October 1921, replacing the 1862 constitution. It was granted by Johann II, Prince of Liechtenstein, and established the rule of partial parliamentary democracy mixed with that of constitutional monarchy, as well as providing for referendums on decisions of the Landtag. It also abolished the three seats in the Landtag appointed by the Prince and lowered the voting age from 24 to 21.

The country replaced universal male suffrage with universal suffrage, following a national referendum in 1984.

Chapters
The constitution has twelve chapters:

Chapter I. The Principality
Chapter II. The Reigning Prince
Chapter III. Responsibilities of the State
Chapter IV. General Rights and Obligations of Liechtenstein Citizens
Chapter V. The Parliament
Chapter VI. The National Committee
Chapter VII. The Government
Chapter VIII. The Courts
A. General Provisions
B. The Ordinary Courts
C. The Administrative Court
D. The Constitutional Court
Chapter IX. Administrative Bodies and Civil Servants
Chapter X. The Municipalities
Chapter XI. Constitutional Amendments and Interpretation
Chapter XII. Final Clauses

Amendments
The constitution has been amended several times, including:
1939: Article 49, paragraph 4 inserted (allowing substitutions for Landtag members unable to attend), article 53 amended
1947: Article 48, paragraphs 2 and 3 and Article 64 paragraphs 2 and 4 amended
1958: Article 47, paragraph 1 and Article 59 amended.
1972: Article 16, paragraphs 6 and 7 annulled. Article 17, paragraph 1 amended.
1973: Article 46, paragraph 3 inserted setting the electoral threshold at 8%. Approved by referendum.
1982: Article 61 amended
1984: Article 48 paragraphs 2 and 3 and Article 64 paragraphs 2 and 4 amended.
1988: Article 46, paragraph 1 amended to increase number of Landtag members from 15 to 25. Approved by referendum.
1989: Article 52, paragraph 2 annulled. Article 63b is inserted.
1992: Article 31, paragraph 2 and 3 amended.
1994: Article 46, paragraph 2 amended and corrected.
1997: Article 46, paragraph 4 amended, paragraph 5 inserted, article 47 paragraph 2 annulled. Article 63ter inserted.
2000: Article 29, paragraph 2 on citizenship amended. Approved by referendum.
2003: Articles 1, 3, 4, 7 (paragraph 2), 10, 11, 13, 13bis, 13ter, 51, 62f, 62g, 63 (paragraphs 1 and 2) all amended. Article 62h inserted. Article 63, paragraph 3 annulled. Approved by referendum.

References

External links
 Full text of the constitution

Law of Liechtenstein
1921 in law
1921 documents
Liechtenstein
1921 in politics
1921 in Liechtenstein
October 1921 events